Raimonda Bložytė-Lukoševičienė (née Bložytė; born 4 December 1987) is a Lithuanian former footballer who played as a forward. She has been a member of the Lithuania women's national team.

Honours 
Gintra Universitetas
Winner
 A Lyga (4): 2010, 2011, 2012, 2013

References

External links

 

1987 births
Living people
Women's association football forwards
Lithuanian women's footballers
Lithuania women's international footballers
Gintra Universitetas players